Brazito is an unincorporated community in Cole County, in the U.S. state of Missouri.

The community is approximately ten miles southwest of Jefferson City along U.S. Route 54.

History
Brazito was laid out in 1850, and named in commemoration of the Battle of El Brazito in the Mexican–American War.  A post office called Brazito was established in 1856, and remained in operation until 1930.

References

Unincorporated communities in Cole County, Missouri
Unincorporated communities in Missouri
Jefferson City metropolitan area